Hanleyanus is a genus of bivalves belonging to the family Tellinidae.

The species of this genus are found in Southeastern Asia and Australia.

Species:

Hanleyanus amboynensis 
Hanleyanus immaculatus 
Hanleyanus oblongus 
Hanleyanus truncatulus 
Hanleyanus vestalioides 
Hanleyanus vestalis

References

Tellinidae
Bivalve genera